

Final standings

ACC tournament
See 1966 ACC men's basketball tournament

NCAA tournament

Regional semifinal
Duke 76, Saint Joseph's 74

Regional final
Duke 91, Syracuse 81

National semifinal
Kentucky 83, Duke 79

National third-place game
Duke 79, Utah 77

ACC's NCAA record
3-1

NIT
League rules prevented ACC teams from playing in the NIT, 1954–1966

External links
 Info at Sports-Reference.com